Shri Amirgadh railway station is a railway station in Banaskantha district, Gujarat, India on the Western line of the North Western railway network. Passenger and DEMU trains halt here.

Trains

 Abu Road - Mahesana DEMU
 Ahmedabad - Jodhpur Passenger
 Ahmedabad - Jaipur Passenger

References 

Railway stations in Banaskantha district
Ajmer railway division